Jeffrey Allen Torborg (born November 26, 1941) is an American former catcher and manager in Major League Baseball. Torborg was signed by the Los Angeles Dodgers as an amateur free agent in 1963. On September 9, 1965, Torborg caught Sandy Koufax's perfect game. On July 20, 1970, he was the catcher receiving Bill Singer's no-hitter, and on May 15, 1973, Torborg also caught the first of Nolan Ryan's seven no-hitters.

College
Torborg grew up in Westfield, New Jersey, where he was the catcher on the Westfield High School baseball team. He caught at Rutgers University in New Brunswick, New Jersey. He was a 1963 All-American, setting the school record for season batting average; his .537 batting average was the highest for 100 at-bats and under. His .537 average was the highest ever recorded up to that time and since then, only two college players have hit for a better average. His slugging percentage that year (1.032) is also a single-season standard. He led the team with 21 RBI and six home runs. In his three-year career from 1961–63, the Torborg batted .390. His number (#10) was retired in 1992. He still holds the career slugging percentage mark of .684. During his career, the Knights were 15–4–1, 14–4 and 11–5 for a three-year mark of 40–13–1 (.741 winning percentage).

Playing career
As a player, he was signed as an amateur free agent by Los Angeles Dodgers in 1963. On March 13, 1971, his contract was sold by the Dodgers to the California Angels. He was traded from the Angels to the St. Louis Cardinals for John Andrews at the Winter Meetings on December 6, 1973. On March 25, 1974, he was released by St. Louis Cardinals.

Coaching, managing, and broadcasting career
After a successful ten-year career as a catcher with the Dodgers and Angels, Torborg switched to coaching. In 1977, he became the manager of the Cleveland Indians (a position he held for three years). He was a coach on the New York Yankees from 1979 to 1988. In 1989, Torborg left the Yankees to become the manager of the Chicago White Sox. A year after he took the helm, the White Sox won 94 games, which was a 25-game improvement from the team's 1989 season. For his efforts with the 1990 White Sox, Torborg won the American League Manager of the Year Award. Torborg would stay with the White Sox for one more year before moving to the New York Mets.

Torborg wasn't as successful with the Mets as he was with the White Sox. A year after leading the White Sox to an 87–75 record, Torborg's 1992 New York Mets posted a 70–92 record. After starting the 1993 season with a 13–25 record, the Mets fired Torborg and replaced him with Dallas Green.

For the rest of the 1990s, Torborg kept busy working as a sportscaster for the likes of CBS Radio and Fox. At CBS Radio, Torborg served as a color commentator for three World Series (1995–1997) alongside Vin Scully. And while at Fox, Torborg served as a color commentator from 1996–2000. Torborg returned to managing, first with the Montreal Expos in 2001 and then the Florida Marlins in 2002.

In 2003, Torborg was fired from the Florida Marlins after they started off the season with a 16–22 record. Jack McKeon was hired to replace him and led the team to a 2003 World Series victory. Torborg then returned to broadcasting for Fox. He served as the color commentator for Atlanta Braves games on FSN South and Turner South in 2006, where he was partnered with Bob Rathbun. However, neither Torborg nor Rathbun was retained for the 2007 season.

Managerial record

Personal life
Torborg is of Danish descent. His son, Dale, is a former professional wrestler and his daughter-in-law, Christi Wolf, is a bodybuilder and former professional wrestler.

For more than 25 years, Torborg lived with his family in a home in Mountainside, New Jersey.

Torborg has Parkinson's disease and no longer signs autographs.

References

External links

 

Major League Baseball catchers
Los Angeles Dodgers players
California Angels players
Minor league baseball managers
Manager of the Year Award winners
All-American college baseball players
Cleveland Indians managers
Chicago White Sox managers
New York Mets managers
Montreal Expos managers
Florida Marlins managers
Atlanta Braves announcers
New York Yankees coaches
Major League Baseball broadcasters
Rutgers Scarlet Knights baseball players
Sportspeople from Plainfield, New Jersey
People from Westfield, New Jersey
Baseball players from New Jersey
1941 births
Living people
Cleveland Indians coaches
Albuquerque Dukes players
Arizona Instructional League Dodgers players
Westfield High School (New Jersey) alumni
People with Parkinson's disease